ChicaGo Dash is an express bus service between Chicago, Illinois and Valparaiso, Indiana.  The distance between the City of Valparaiso and Downtown Chicago is about 54 miles. It is jointly run by the city of Valparaiso and the Valparaiso Redevelopment Commission, with substantial financial support from the Northwest Indiana Regional Development Authority. It was launched on October 6, 2008.

History and Current Operations 

ChicaGo Dash travels between Valparaiso's Village Station and Downtown Chicago, Illinois. There are currently three stops in Chicago: Michigan/Randolph near Millennium Park, at the LaSalle Street/ Wacker Drive intersection, and in front of 333 S. Franklin St. There is currently one stop in Valparaiso at 58 S. Campbell Street.

The service is rush hour only – it makes four trips from Valparaiso to Chicago in the morning and four trips from Chicago to Valparaiso in the evening.

The ChicaGo Dash began in 2008 as a way for residents of the Greater Valparaiso Area to commute to work in downtown Chicago. Historically, jobs in downtown Chicago have offered higher salaries than those found in Northwest Indiana. Prior to the Dash, those wishing to work in Chicago had to either drive to the NICTD South Shore train station in Chesterton, Indiana (a 20+ minute drive from Valparaiso) or drive themselves to Chicago.

In May 2009, V-Line introduced a shuttle service between Dune Park South Shore Line station and the Village Station later in the evening to supplement ChicaGo Dash and provide additional commuting options. It was scheduled to remain in place for the remainder of 2009. As of February 1, 2010, the shuttle service has been canceled. The shuttle was eliminated due to low ridership.

In May 2009, ChicaGo Dash launched a special summer Saturday service. The bus left the Village Station at 10:00am and arrived at the Water Tower Place at 12:05 pm making stops at the Millennium Park and Navy Pier. The bus left the Water Tower Place at 6:00 pm, arriving at the Village Station at 8:00 pm.

On August 17, 2009, ChicaGo Dash extended its Saturday service into the fall and added a second bus. Its schedule was designed to attract Valparaiso University students who may have been interested in going to the city in the evening. The new bus left the village station at 3:00 pm and returned in midnight, making the same stops as the other bus. The weekend route made a stop at Valparaiso University's Harre Union at 9:15 am and 2:15 pm before arriving at the Village Station. This section of the route was essentially a free shuttle service - once they reached the Village Station, passengers had half an hour to buy tickets to go the rest of the way. On the same date, ChicaGo Dash added a third bus to the weekday service. It left the Village Station at 7:15am, arriving at Millennium Park at 8:20 am. It left Chicago at 3:40 pm.

On August 31, 2009, a third AM and PM departure time was added.

On November 12, 2009, ChicaGo Dash decided to cancel the second Saturday bus, citing low ridership. On December 27, 2009, Saturday service was canceled completely.

Valparaiso officials have considered adding a stop at Hobart. During the Spring of 2010, Hobart officials conducted surveys of Hobart population to determine whether or not there is enough interest in the stop. The city of Hobart is currently in the process of finalizing the lease for the prospective stop, and a test run is currently slated to occur some time in October

In 2013, the ChicaGo Dash rolled out a new bus tracking system. Users can download the free app on their android or Apple device by searching for "doublemap" in the app store. Once downloaded, users can track where the buses are in real time. The app also works for the City's V-Line bus service. Alternatively, the app can be viewed through the City's website.

Also in 2013, the ChicaGo Dash added a fourth departure time to its schedule. The added bus was placed to leave Valpo at 6:20am and leave Michigan/Randolph at 4:25pm in the evening.

Tickets 
One-way ChicaGo Dash tickets are $8.00. Riders can also buy 10-ride passes ($70.00) and monthly passes ($230.00). Monthly passes are sold based on the calendar month. Tickets can be purchased at the Village Station before departures or on the bus (using exact change only). The ChicaGo Dash accepts Visa, MasterCard, WageWorks, FTA FareChecks, and personal checks.

Service Times 

Departs Valpo Village Station:

Departs Chicago:

Valparaiso Village Station 

Valparaiso Village Station serves as ChicaGo Dash's Valparaiso station. It is located just west of the Franklin House (58 South Campbell Street). The glass bus station includes a heated waiting room, a ticket counter, and bicycle storage. The station is open thirty minutes prior to boarding and remains open until all buses leave.

ChicaGo Dash riders can transfer in the evening to V-Line's Yellow Line route at Lincolnway and Campbell intersection less than a block north of the station building and to Brown Line route at Indiana/Campbell intersection south of the building near Norfolk Southern railroad tracks. Riders can also transfer to Red Line route Friday-Sunday at the same location as the Yellow Line route.

See also
V-Line

References

External links
 ChicaGo Dash's Official Website
 New ChicaGo Dash buses arrive

Bus transportation in Indiana
Valparaiso, Indiana
Transportation in Porter County, Indiana
2008 establishments in Indiana